The 1979 Stanford Cardinals football team represented Stanford University in the Pacific-10 Conference during the 1979 NCAA Division I-A football season. Led by first-year head coach Rod Dowhower, the Cardinals had a 5–5–1 overall record (3–3–1 in Pac-10, sixth). 

Senior starting quarterback Turk Schonert split time with freshman John Elway.

Dowhower was promoted to head coach in January; he was previously the receivers coach for two seasons under Bill Walsh, who left for the NFL's San Francisco 49ers. After the season in January 1980, Dowhower left to become the offensive coordinator with the NFL's Denver Broncos, and was succeeded by alumnus Paul Wiggin.

Schedule

Roster

Game summaries

Tulane

San Jose State

Mike Dotterer became the first freshman in school history to score three touchdowns in one game during Stanford's 45–29 victory. The Spartans were led by first-year head coach Jack Elway, father of John, who became Stanford's head coach after the 1983 season.

at Arizona

Source:

California

References

Stanford
Stanford Cardinal football seasons
Stanford Cardinals football